François Lefebvre de Caumartin or Jean François Paul Lefèvre de Caumartin (16 December 1668 in Châlons-en-Champagne – 30 August 1733 in Blois) was a French bishop.

He was elected member of the Académie Française in 1694 and member of the Académie des inscriptions et belles-lettres in 1701.

External links
 Académie française

Members of the Académie Française
Bishops of Vannes
Members of the Académie des Inscriptions et Belles-Lettres
1668 births
1733 deaths